Lassan Nawab (لساں نواب) is a town situated in a long and narrow valley about 32 kilometers from Mansehra city. Lassan Nawab town is also a union council (an administrative subdivision) of Mansehra District in Khyber-Pakhtunkhwa province of Pakistan.

Demographics
The main language spoken in Lassan Nawab is Hindko. The main tribe living in Lassan Nawab is the Tanoli tribe.

 It is located in the south of the district and borders Haripur and Abbottabad districts.

Formerly it was a part of the Princely State of Amb.

References

Union councils of Mansehra District
Populated places in Mansehra District